Anchialos is a village and a community of the Chalkidona municipality. Before the 2011 local government reform it was part of the municipality of Agios Athanasios, of which it was a municipal district. The 2011 census recorded 738 inhabitants in the community. The community of Anchialos covers an area of 11.011 km2.

See also
 List of settlements in the Thessaloniki regional unit

References

Populated places in Thessaloniki (regional unit)